The 1936 Wimbledon Championships took place on the outdoor grass courts at the All England Lawn Tennis and Croquet Club in Wimbledon, London, United Kingdom. The tournament was held from Monday 22 June until Saturday 4 July 1936. It was the 56th edition of the Wimbledon Championships, and the third Grand Slam of Year. Fred Perry and Helen Jacobs won the gentlemen's and ladies' singles titles.

This was the first and only Wimbledon tournament during the reign of King Edward VIII.

Finals

Men's singles

 Fred Perry defeated  Gottfried von Cramm, 6–1, 6–1, 6–0

Women's singles

 Helen Jacobs defeated  Hilde Sperling, 6–2, 4–6, 7–5

Men's doubles

 Pat Hughes /  Raymond Tuckey defeated  Charles Hare /  Frank Wilde, 6–4, 3–6, 7–9, 6–1, 6–4

Women's doubles

 Freda James /  Kay Stammers defeated  Sarah Fabyan /  Helen Jacobs, 6–2, 6–1

Mixed doubles

 Fred Perry /  Dorothy Round defeated  Don Budge /  Sarah Fabyan, 7–9, 7–5, 6–4

References

External links
 Official Wimbledon Championships website

 
Wimbledon Championships
Wimbledon Championships
Wimbledon Championships
Wimbledon Championships